The Pine Ridge National Recreation Area is a United States national recreation area in the Pine Ridge region of northwestern Nebraska. The recreation area is managed by the Pine Ridge Ranger District of the Nebraska National Forest.

It is home to wildlife species such as coyotes, bobcats, elk, white-tailed deer, mule deer, eagles, hawks, and wild turkeys.

Activities in the recreation area include hiking, horseback riding, and mountain biking. Life in the recreation area includes ponderosa pines and the animals that feed on them. The closest major town is Chadron, Nebraska.

External links
 Pine Ridge Ranger District/Pine Ridge National Recreation Area

Protected areas of Dawes County, Nebraska
National Recreation Areas of the United States
Federal lands in Nebraska
Protected areas of Nebraska